Hiré is a town in southern Ivory Coast. It is a sub-prefecture and commune of Divo Department in Lôh-Djiboua Region, Gôh-Djiboua District.

In 2021, the population of the sub-prefecture of Hiré was 78,139.

Villages
The 6 villages of the sub-prefecture of Hiré and their population in 2014 are:
 Bouakako (1 233)
 Douaville (2 780)
 Gogobro (4 355)
 Hiré (31 960)
 Kagbé (8 560)
 Zaroko (1 469)

References

Sub-prefectures of Lôh-Djiboua
Communes of Lôh-Djiboua